The 2005 Milan–San Remo was the 96th edition of the monument cycling classic race Milan–San Remo. It was held on 19 March 2005 and saw the first win of Italian rider Alessandro Petacchi in the Via Roma in a bunch sprint.

General standings 
Source:

 Danilo Hondo was later disqualified for failing to pass a doping test.

References

External links
Race website

2005
March 2005 sports events in Europe
2005 UCI ProTour
2005 in Italian sport
2005 in road cycling